Michael Cummins (6 September 1878 – 24 December 1948) was an Irish hurler who played for the Wexford senior team.

Cummins joined the team during the 1901 championship and was a regular member of the starting fifteen until his retirement after the 1918 championship. During that time he won one All-Ireland and three Munster medals. An All-Ireland runner-up on one occasion, Cummins also won Tyler Cup and Croke Cup medals as a Gaelic footballer.

At club level Cummins was a two-time county club championship medallist with Ballymurn.

References

1878 births
1948 deaths
Crossabeg Ballymurn hurlers
Wexford inter-county hurlers
All-Ireland Senior Hurling Championship winners